Mohammed Ali Ayed Metlaq Alshimmariis an Emirati footballer who plays as a defender.

Career Stats

References

http://uae.agleague.ae/en/person/mohammed-ali-ayed.html
http://www.alittihad.ae/details.php?id=9926&y=2017&article=full
http://sport360.com/article/arabian-gulf-league/32491/al-ahli-woes-continue-1-0-defeat-al-shabab
http://gulfnews.com/sport/uae/football/ayed-pursues-a-twin-dream-of-uae-colours-agl-1.1920081
http://khaleejtimes.com/sport/local/shabab-rally-past-sharjah-kalba-stun-dibba-as-hatta-hold-wahda

Al Ain FC players
Al Shabab Al Arabi Club Dubai players
Emirati footballers
Al Jazira Club players
Al-Nasr SC (Dubai) players
Living people
UAE Pro League players
1990 births
Association football defenders